Asthal Bohar, also known as Bohar, is a village on the outskirts of Rohtak city in Rohtak District, Haryana, India. Asthal means Bairagi Monastery. Jain, Nath Shaivite and Brahminical images were found in Asthal Bohr monastery. A seventh century AD statue of Parshvanatha, twenty-third Jain tirthankara, was found in the village.

It has a railway station on Rewari-Rohtak line.

References

Citations

Sources
 

Villages in Rohtak district